Ko Pha-ngan is an island in the Gulf of Thailand in Surat Thani Province of southern Thailand. Ko Pha-ngan has two sister islands: the larger Ko Samui to the south and the smaller Ko Tao to the north.

 Estimated perimeter:  (estimated 10 hr average walking time)
 From mainland: about 
 From Ko Samui: about 
 From Ko Tao: about 
 Main town: Thong Sala
 Highest Point: Khao Ra,

History
The name Ko Pha-ngan derives from the word "ngan", meaning 'sand bar' in southern Thai, for there are many sand bars offshore.

Ko Pha-ngan has been a longtime favorite of past kings of Thailand. Rama V, or Chulalongkorn, for example, visited Ko Pha-ngan 14 times during his reign.

The Bronze Drum of Dongson Culture (500–100 BCE) that was found on Ko Samui in 1977 is evidence that there were settlements of people on Ko Samui, Ko Pha-ngan, and their islets more than two thousand years ago. Some historians and archaeologists believe that the first group who migrated to Ko Pha-ngan were Austronesian peoples who travelled by boat from the Malay Peninsula.

Over the last century the island's population has steadily expanded, first living off the sea and the land and farming coconuts. Later, tin mining became part of the economy. In the 1970s the mining industry faltered and finally petered out. Over the next decade, tourism took hold and now it is primarily a tourist destination. Fishing and coconut farming remain important to the local economy.

Due to its topography, the population hugs the coastline. The mountainous interior is generally inaccessible. It is also considered a spiritual place, with numerous Buddhist temples around the island and a thriving spa, retreat, and meditation industry.

Transport

Visitors can reach the island by commercial boats from the mainland from three ports in Samui, three ports in Surat Thani and one in Chumphon.
 
The main boat transport companies are Seatran Discovery, Lomprayah, Raja Ferry, Hadrin Queen, Nighboat and Songserm.

Since 2012 Kannithi Aviation (Kan Air) has attempted to construct an airport on the island. The project, originally estimated at 900 million baht—now estimated to cost two billion baht—has faced inflated costs, delays resulting from the yet-to-be-issued environmental impact assessment and other complications, which pushed back initial plans to open in 2014. Kan Air's president claimed the airport would be open by the end of 2017.

Administration

Central administration
Ko Pha-ngan together with Ko Tao and a few minor islands forms the district (amphoe) Ko Pha-ngan. The district is divided into three subdistricts (tambons), which are further subdivided into 17 administrative villages (mubans).

Local administration
There are four subdistrict municipalities (thesaban tambons) in the district:
 Ko Pha-ngan consisting of parts of subdistricts Ko Pha-ngan and Ban Tai.
 Phet Pha-ngan consisting of parts of subdistrict Ko Pha-ngan.
 Ban Tai consisting of parts of subdistrict Ban Tai.
 Ko Tao consisting of subdistrict Ko Tao.

History
Originally the island was administered from Ko Samui District. The minor district (king amphoe) Ko Pha-ngan was established on 1 October 1970, then consisting of the two tambons, Ko Pha-ngan and Ban Tai. It was upgraded to a full district on 12 April 1977. Ko Tao subdistrict was established on 15 August 1982 by splitting off the three administrative villages on Ko Tao Island from Ko Pha-ngan subdistrict.

Environmental issues
 the island receives about 458,000 visitors per year. They and the island residents generate about 7,300 tonnes of solid waste per year. Untreated wastewater discharges and on-going coral bleaching are also issues.

The Thai government, the local government as well as local non profit organisations such as EcoThailand Foundation or Trash Hero, local businesses such as the Sea Flower Bungalows, Sarikantang Resort but mainly locals both Thai citizens and foreigner's expatriates work for many years to continue the preservation, cleaning and restoration of the Green Island of Koh Phangan which is unique in the Gulf of Thailand.

On May 2014, The Office of Natural Resources and Environmental Policy and Planning (Onep) has declared Koh Samui, Koh Tao and Koh Phangan districts in Surat Thani province part of an environmentally-protected zone after nine years of efforts to regulate commercial development on the islands.

The Onep declaration, which came into force on May 30, means all commercial activities on Koh Samui, Koh Tao, Koh Phangan and 39 other islands in those districts will be restricted to preserve the environment, said Onep deputy secretary-general Noppadol Thiyajai. “We hope the declaration will at least help maintain the environment on the islands. We understand the measure may not result in significant environmental improvements, but it is better than having nothing,” Mr Noppadol said.

The TAT has helped the island to be promoted as a Green Island following the strong will of its inhabitants.

The fauna and flora of the island of Koh Phangan is exceptional, rare pink dolphins are even spotted its waters.

The island is regularly under the spotlights for its remarkable community involving both Thai and Foreigners working more and more together for a sustainable and socially fair tourism benefiting directly the local community.

Beach cleaning operations have been done for years and are gaining popularity.

In 2020 the Island standing out with its new social actions during the COVID-19 crisis with food distributions, food banks, free community gardens showing above words that this community is about actions. A group of volunteers consisting of islanders and expats formed a group called Forward Phangan to focus on sustainability and improving the image of the island.

The island is also strongly engaged in organic sustainable farming producing and produces a large amount of organic fruits, vegetables, fertilisers, insect repellents and more. The Raitiaviset farm is a perfect example of this success.

Refill shops are blooming following this philosophy such as Unpacked.

Mr Pirat Promcharoen says "We'd like to turn the tourism industry into a more sustainable community-oriented affair" illustrating this will of the island inhabitants to turn towards a more high-end quieter and sustainable economy aiming at protecting the landscape, the Nature and most of all the unusual vibe of this famous Phangan hippie trail community.

In popular culture
Ko Pha-ngan featured prominently in Alex Garland's 1996 novel The Beach and is also mentioned in the 2006 song Magick by the new rave band Klaxons (but probably more as a reference to the 1996 novel The Beach than the island itself).

The Full Moon Party is a monthly dance music festival set on Hat Rin Nok Beach scheduled every month at full moon. The event primarily features electronic music and attracts around 30,000 party-goers in a normal month. Steps are being taken to make Ko Pha-ngan a more family-friendly tourist destination, promoting the island's natural attractions and also stepping up the police presence; road blocks with stop and search procedures are commonplace and undercover police also patrol parties.

There are also a Half Moon Party and Jungle Experience Party held every month. They take places in the jungle inland from Ban Tai requiring tuk-tuk, taxi or bike transport to and from.

The song "Vision in Blue" on the album The Golden Ratio by Ace of Base mentions Ko Pha-ngan.

DJ/producer Ashley Wallbridge titled his 2012 song "Kopanang", an anglicized version of Ko Pha-ngan.

The British psychedelic rock band Ozric Tentacles featured a song called Ko Pha-ngan on their 1989 album The Bits Between The Bits.

In 2016, Infected Mushroom collaborated with Hatikva 6 to release a song called "Hotel Koh Phangan."

Education

Thai schools
There are about 10 Thai governmental schools for children on Koh Phangan. The education is free, but the learners are required to speak and write in Thai Language.

Schools for foreigners
There are some private educational institutions following the national curriculum of England:

Nurseries
The Learning Tree Nursery & Kindergarten was opened in 2008 for children 2 to 7 years old.
Babelikoh nursery was opened in 2022 for toddlers from 1 to 3 years old.

Primary
Si Ri Panya International School opened in 2012 provides education for children 5 to 11 years old (Key stages 1 & 2).

Wisdom College Tutorial and Vocational school starts Forest Schools primary programme for children 7-9 years old in September 2022.

Secondary
Si Ri Panya International School provides education for children ages 12–13 (Key stage 3) with admission open for the secondary age year 7 class in September 2022 with planned expansion into year 8.

Wisdom College Tutorial and Vocational School mirrors the Cambridge curriculum for children 10 to 18 years old (Stage 7-12). The learners can graduate with an academic diploma, recognized by universities worldwide. The school also practices outdoor learning to find a balance between children's academic progress and joy.

See also
List of islands of Thailand
Banana Pancake Trail
Half Moon Festival

References

External links

Ko Pha-ngan
Pha-ngan
Islands of the Gulf of Thailand